Corporate accountability is the acknowledgement and assumption of responsibility for the consequences of a company's actions.

Corporate accountability may also refer to:

 Corporate accountability for human rights violations
 Corporate Accountability, an American non-profit organization
 Social accounting
 Environmental accounting
 Corporate social responsibility